Fragrance extraction refers to the separation process of aromatic compounds from raw materials, using methods such as distillation, solvent extraction, expression, sieving, or enfleurage. The results of the extracts are either essential oils, absolutes, concretes, or butters, depending on the amount of waxes in the extracted product.

To a certain extent, all of these techniques tend to produce an extract with an aroma that differs from the aroma of the raw materials. Heat, chemical solvents, or exposure to oxygen in the extraction process may denature some aromatic compounds, either changing their odour character or rendering them odourless, and the proportion of each aromatic component that is extracted can differ.

Maceration/solvent extraction

Certain plant materials contain too little volatile oil to undergo expression, or their chemical components are too delicate and easily denatured by the high heat used in steam distillation. Instead, the oils are extracted using their solvent properties.

Organic solvent extraction
Organic solvent extraction is the most common and most economically important technique for extracting aromatics in the modern perfume industry. Raw materials are submerged and agitated in a solvent that can dissolve the desired aromatic compounds. Commonly used solvents for maceration/solvent extraction include hexane, and dimethyl ether.

In organic solvent extraction, aromatic compounds as well as other hydrophobic soluble substances such as wax and pigments are also obtained. The extract is subjected to vacuum processing, which removes the solvent for re-use. The process can last anywhere from hours to months. Fragrant compounds for woody and fibrous plant materials are often obtained in this matter as are all aromatics from animal sources. The technique can also be used to extract odorants that are too volatile for distillation or easily denatured by heat. The remaining waxy mass is known as a concrete, which is a mixture of essential oil, waxes, resins, and other lipophilic (oil-soluble) plant material, since these solvents effectively remove all hydrophobic compounds in the raw material. The solvent is then removed by a lower temperature distillation process and reclaimed for re-use.

Although highly fragrant, concretes are too viscous – even solid – at room temperature to be useful. This is due to the presence of high-molecular-weight, non-fragrant waxes and resins. Another solvent, often ethyl alcohol, which only dissolves the fragrant low-molecular weight compounds, must be used to extract the fragrant oil from the concrete. The alcohol is removed by a second distillation, leaving behind the absolute. These extracts from plants such as jasmine and rose, are called absolutes.

Due to the low temperatures in this process, the absolute may be more faithful to the original scent of the raw material, which is subjected to high heat during the distillation process.

Supercritical fluid extraction
Supercritical fluid extraction is a relatively new technique for extracting fragrant compounds from a raw material, which often employs supercritical CO2 as the extraction solvent. When carbon dioxide is put under high pressure at slightly above room temperature, a supercritical fluid forms (Under normal pressure CO2 changes directly from a solid to a gas in a process known as sublimation.) Since CO2 in a non-polar compound has low surface tension and wets easily, it can be used to extract the typically hydrophobic aromatics from the plant material. This process is identical to one of the techniques for making decaffeinated coffee.

In supercritical fluid extraction, high pressure carbon dioxide gas (up to 100 atm.) is used as a solvent. Due to the low heat of process and the relatively unreactive solvent used in the extraction, the fragrant compounds derived often closely resemble the original odour of the raw material. Like solvent extraction, the CO2 extraction takes place at a low temperature, extracts a wide range of compounds, and leaves the aromatics unaltered by heat, rendering an essence more faithful to the original. Since CO2 is gas at normal atmospheric pressure, it also leaves no trace of itself in the final product, thus allowing one to get the absolute directly without having to deal with a concrete. It is a low-temperature process, and the solvents are easily removed. Extracts produced using this process are known as CO2 extracts.

Ethanol extraction
Ethanol extraction is a type of solvent extraction used to extract fragrant compounds directly from dry raw materials, as well as the impure oils or concrete resulting from organic solvent extraction, expression, or enfleurage. Ethanol extracts from dry materials are called tinctures, while ethanol washes for purifying oils and concretes are called absolutes.

The impure substances or oils are mixed with ethanol, which is less hydrophobic than solvents used for organic extraction, dissolves more of the oxidized aromatic constituents (alcohols, aldehydes, etc.), leaving behind the wax, fats, and other generally hydrophobic substances. The alcohol is evaporated under low-pressure, leaving behind absolute. The absolute may be further processed to remove any impurities that are still present from the solvent extraction.

Ethanol extraction is not typically used to extract fragrance from fresh plant materials; these contain large quantities of water, which will be extracted into the ethanol, although this is sometimes not a concern.

Distillation
Distillation is a common technique for obtaining aromatic compounds from plants, such as orange blossoms and roses. The raw material is heated and the fragrant compounds are re-collected through condensation of the distilled vapor. Distilled products, whether through steam or dry distillation are known either as essential oils or ottos.

Today, most common essential oils, such as lavender, peppermint, and eucalyptus, are distilled. Raw plant material, consisting of the flowers, leaves, wood, bark, roots, seeds, or peel, is put into an alembic (distillation apparatus) over water.

Steam distillation

Steam from boiling water is passed through the raw material for 60–105 minutes, which drives out most of their volatile fragrant compounds. The condensate from distillation, which contain both water and the aromatics, is settled in a Florentine flask. This allows for the easy separation of the fragrant oils from the water as the oil will float to the top of the distillate where it is removed, leaving behind the watery distillate. The water collected from the condensate, which retains some of the fragrant compounds and oils from the raw material, is called hydrosol and is sometimes sold for consumer and commercial use. This method is most commonly used for fresh plant materials such as flowers, leaves, and stems. Popular hydrosols are rose water, lavender water, and orange blossom water. Many plant hydrosols have unpleasant smells and are therefore not sold.

Most oils are distilled in a single process. One exception is Ylang-ylang (Cananga odorata), which takes 22 hours to complete distillation. It is fractionally distilled, producing several grades (Ylang-Ylang "extra", I, II, III and "complete", in which the distillation is run from start to finish with no interruption).

Dry/destructive distillation
Also known as rectification, the raw materials are directly heated in a still without a carrier solvent such as water. Fragrant compounds that are released from the raw material by the high heat often undergo anhydrous pyrolysis, which results in the formation of different fragrant compounds, and thus different fragrant notes. This method is used to obtain fragrant compounds from fossil amber and fragrant woods (such as birch tar) where an intentional "burned" or "toasted" odour is desired.

Fractionation distillation
Through the use of a fractionation column, different fractions distilled from a material can be selectively excluded to manipulate the scent of the final product. Although the product is more expensive, this is sometimes performed to remove unpleasant or undesirable scents of a material and affords the perfumer more control over their composition process. This is often performed as a second step on material that has already been extracted rather than on raw material.

Expression
Expression as a method of fragrance extraction where raw materials are pressed, squeezed or compressed and the essential oils are collected. In contemporary times, the only fragrant oils obtained using this method are the peels of fruits in the citrus family. This is due to the large quantity of oil is present in the peels of these fruits as to make this extraction method economically feasible. Citrus peel oils are expressed mechanically, or cold-pressed. Due to the large quantities of oil in citrus peel and the relatively low cost to grow and harvest the raw materials, citrus-fruit oils are cheaper than most other essential oils to the extent that purified limonene extracted from these fruit is available as an affordable naturally-derived solvent. Lemon or sweet orange oils that are obtained as by-products of the commercial citrus industry are among the cheapest citrus oils.

Expression was mainly used prior to the discovery of distillation, and this is still the case in cultures such as Egypt. Traditional Egyptian practice involves pressing the plant material, then burying it in unglazed ceramic vessels in the desert for a period of months to drive out water. The water has a smaller molecular size, so it diffuses through the ceramic vessels, while the larger essential oils do not. The lotus oil in Tutankhamen's tomb, which retained its scent after 3000 years sealed in alabaster vessels, was pressed in this manner.

Enfleurage
Enfleurage is a process in which the odour of aromatic materials is absorbed into wax or fat, which is then often extracted with alcohol. Extraction by enfleurage was commonly used when distillation was not possible because some fragrant compounds denature through high heat. This technique is not commonly used in modern industry, due to both its prohibitive cost and the existence of more efficient and effective extraction methods.

See also
 Perfume
 Rose oil
 Clove oil

Oils
 
Aromatherapy
Perfumery
Flavor technology